Seculum Seculi is a 1988 album by Norwegian singer Sigvart Dagsland released by Kirkelig Kulturverksted.

It includes the 1987 single Folket som danser, a duet with Sissel Kyrkjebø.

Track listing
Naken hud   
Livshjulet   
Seculum Seculi   
Det går ein bro  
Den 4. verden   
Kan e.g. gjorr någe med det   
Bygg ein bro   
Månen lar det skje    
Merre lys  
Folket som danser (with Sissel Kyrkjebø)
Alt for ingenting   
Ennå her inne

References

Sissel Kyrkjebø and Sigvart Dagsland performing "Folket som danser" on Norwegian Television in 1987

1988 albums